Zarafshon Panjakent is football club based in Panjakent. They played one season in the Tajik League, the top division of the country, as newly promoted team in 2012, but finished bottom and were relegated.

League and domestic cup history

References

External links
 ЧЕМПИОНАТ ТАДЖИКИСТАНА. 2-Й ТУР (Russian)
 Чемпионат Таджикистана: итоги трансферного рынка межсезонья
Soccerway.com profile

Football clubs in Tajikistan